Faul & Wad Ad are a French DJ and record producer duo from Paris who had a hit in 2013 with the tropical house track "Changes".

Career

Early beginnings
Faul (stylized as FAUL, meaning lazy in German; the pseudonym of French DJ Maxime Ledu) and Wad Ad (the stage name of French DJ Camil Meyer) met in high school and began producing music during their study time. Maxime Ledu was a student at the Lycee Édouard Branly in Nogent-sur-Marne.

2013–present: Changes
In 2013, they heard Pnau, a dance music side project originating from Sydney, sampling a children's choir on the track "Baby". In May 2013, Faul & Wad Ad released their tropical house-style adaptation online, calling it "Changes". The track went on to become an international hit for them, topping the singles chart in Germany. It also charted in Austria, Belgium, Hungary, Netherlands, Spain and Switzerland.

Discography

Singles

References

French DJs
French musical duos
Tropical house musicians
Electronic dance music DJs